Tata Birla Madhyalo Laila is a 2006 Indian Telugu-language film produced by Bekkam Venugopal, in his film debut and directed by Srinivasa Reddy. The film stars Sivaji, Krishna Bhagavan, and Laya in lead roles. The film is a remake of the 1996 Tamil movie Tata Birla.

Plot
Tata (Sivaji) and Birla (Krishna Bhagavan) are 2 petty thieves who dream of planning a big robbery one day. Their dreams come true when they overhear a deal involving hundreds of crores. They lock up the original man who's hired for the deal and head to the home of Mahalakshmi (Laya), a wealthy heiress. They gradually realize the happiness of life and decide to quit being thieves. But it is then revealed that the deal was to kill Mahalakshmi and that the man responsible for the deal was Mahalakshmi's uncle Gajapathi (Tanikella Bharani). Soon Mahalakshmi even falls in love with Tata and he too falls for her eventually. Meanwhile, another mysterious man disguised as a lady (Ali) enters their household to kill Mahalakshmi as well. The rest of the story depicts on how Tata and Birla save Mahalakshmi from Gajapathi's plans and who the strange man really is.

Cast
Sivaji as Tata
Krishna Bhagavaan as Birla
Ali as Laila
Laya as Mahalakshmi
Tanikella Bharani as Gajapathi
Raghu Babu as Thief Adhova Swamiji
Duvvasi Mohan as Potti lingam
Gangadhar Panday as Businessman
Subhashini as House Owner
Padmanabham as Padmanabham

Soundtrack

See also
Tata-Birla word pair

References

External links
Tata birla Madhyalo Laila in USA
Trailers
Review
 

2006 films
2000s Telugu-language films